Sansoni is a surname, and may refer to:
Barbara Sansoni (1928-2022), Sri Lankan designer, artist, colourist, entrepreneur, and writer
Doreen Sansoni (1911–1977), Sri Lankan tennis player
Héctor Barrantes Sansoni (1939–1990), Argentine polo player and stepfather of Sarah, Duchess of York
Louis Sansoni (c.1775 – 1831), Postmaster General of Ceylon
Miliani Sansoni, Sri Lankan judge
Raffaele Sansoni Galeoti Riario (1461–1521), Italian cardinal 
Sébastien Sansoni (born 1978), French footballer
Stéphane Sansoni (born 1967), former professional tennis player from France

Other uses 
 Sansoni is an Italian publisher founded in 1873 by Giulio Cesare Sansoni, located in Florence.
 Autographa sansoni, also known as the Alberta beauty, is a moth of the family Noctuidae
 Habronattus sansoni is a species of jumping spider in the family Salticidae